Ustad Ahmed Jan Khan "Thirakwa" was an Indian tabla player, commonly considered the pre-eminent soloist among tabla players of the 20th century, and among the most influential percussionists in the history of Indian Classical Music.  

He was known for his mastery of the finger techniques and aesthetic values of various tabla styles, technical virtuosity, formidable stage presence, and soulful musicality.  While he had command over the traditional tabla repertoire of various gharanas, he was also distinguished by the way in which he brought together these diverse compositions, his reinterpretation of traditional methods of improvisation, and his own compositions. His solo recitals were of the first to elevate the art of playing tabla solo to an art in its own right in the popular mind. His style of playing influenced many generations of tabla players specially today’s foremost Tabla maestro Pandit Nayan Ghosh besides the maestro’s nephew ustad Rashid Mustafa.  lineage with his contribution to Indian classical music.

Early life and career
Ahmed Jan later known as 'Ahmed Jan Thirakwa' was born to a family of musicians in 1892 in Moradabad in the North-Western Provinces of British India. Although his early musical training was in Hindustani vocals and the sarangi, his interest in tabla was aroused when he first heard tabla player Munir Khan. He became Munir Khan's disciple at the age of 12. According to The Hindu newspaper article, "When he was around 12, Ahmed Jan was brought to Bombay by his father Hussain Bakhsh and elder brother Mia Jan, both of whom were noted sarangi players, and placed in the hands of the tabla stalwart Ustad Munir Khan. The tutelage was to last for 25 years but at a very early stage, his guru's father, Kale Khan, nicknamed him "Thirakwa" because of his playful and naughty nature." For a long time, he played tabla in the court of the Nawab of Rampur and during this time, came in close contact with the maestroes of Agra, Jaipur, Gwalior and Patiala gharanas  — both vocalists and instrumentalists. On very few occasions, he rendered Bandishes in his own voice but this was only in the company of extremely close compatriots and admirers. As an accompanist, he was equally loved respected and admired by his peers and elders. Two noteworthy artists in this category of admirers was the great Rabindrasangeet exponent Suchitra Mitra (1924–2011) and the famous tabla player Pandit Nikhil Ghosh.

The name "Thirakwa" is not actually his original name, but was a nickname he earned from his guru's father. One day, while watching him practise, his guru's father remarked that he played so well his fingers seemed to be "shimmering" on the tabla. This earned him the nickname Thirakwa (shimmering). It is also rumored that his tone was similar to the thunderous cracking sound of lightning. A great lightning is sometimes described as "Thirakwa". In popular jargon, Ahmad Jan Thirakwa is termed as the "Mount Everest of Tabla". He performed at regular intervals in almost all the music conferences in various parts of the country and gained popularity as well as admiration. A connoisseur of biryani and kababs, Ahmad Jan was famous for his interpretation of the wide-ranging patterns of the beat-cycles which he liberally taught to his disciples. A few number of his live recordings are now available in audio-visual form that include excerpts from his different programmes over the years and which also provide glimpses of his mastery over percussion.

According to The Hindu newspaper article on Ahmed Jan Thirakwa, "Ustad Thirakwa, for instance, was revered both as a soloist and an accompanist. He belongs to the glittering galaxy of Hindustani classical music along with other supernovae such as Aftab-e-Mausiqui ('Sun of Music') Faiyaz Khan, Abdul Karim Khan, Allabande Khan, Alladiya Khan, Allauddin Khan and Bade Ghulam Ali Khan."

Disciples
Ustad Ahmed Jan Thirakwa, during his long career as a musician, trained many disciples all across India including Pt. Prem Vallabh ji,  Pandit Lalji Gokhale, Pt. Nikhil Ghosh (tabla player) and famous vocalist of Agra gharana Pandit Jagannathbuwa Purohit, Pandit Narayanrao Joshi, Pandit Bhai Gaitonde, Pandit Bapu Patwardhan, Shri Anand Shidhaye and Rashid Mustafa Thirakwa are some of his well-known shagirds. Ustad Ahmed Jan's unique style continues to attract many tabla players of present generation including Ustad Zakir Hussain, Pandit Chandra Nath Shastri, Pandit Anindo Chatterjee and Pandit Nikhil Ghosh.

Awards and recognition
 Sangeet Natak Akademi Award for tabla in 1954
 Padma Bhushan Award for Arts in 1970

Death and legacy
Ahmed Jan Thirakwa died on 13 January 1976 at Lucknow, India at age 84.

As of 2015, an 'Ustad Ahmed Jan Thirakwa Music Festival' is held every year to pay tribute to him by music enthusiasts in many major cities of India – Delhi, Pune, Mumbai, Kolhapur.

See also
Pandit Anokhelal Mishra
Pandit Kishan Maharaj
Pandit Samta Prasad
Ustad Alla Rakha
Ustad Zakir Hussain

References

External links
Thirakhwa's page in Vijaya Parrikar Library of Indian Classical Music

1892 births
1976 deaths
Indian Muslims
Hindustani instrumentalists
Recipients of the Padma Bhushan in arts
People from Moradabad
Recipients of the Sangeet Natak Akademi Award
Tabla players
20th-century Indian musicians
20th-century drummers